Penns Park is the oldest village in Wrightstown Township, Pennsylvania, United States. The village is located in the center of the township. The Zip Code is 18943. The crossroads village was known as Logtown as early as 1716 and Pennsville in the early 19th century. In 1862, the village name was changed to its current one. Just outside the village, at the intersection of Penns Park Road and Mud Road, there is still a solitary log house, often called the oldest house in Bucks County. To the southwest of the village is the "old grave yard" where many of the township's first settlers are buried. The Penns Park Historic District and Penn's Park General Store Complex are listed on the National Register of Historic Places.

References

Historic districts on the National Register of Historic Places in Pennsylvania
National Register of Historic Places in Bucks County, Pennsylvania
Unincorporated communities in Bucks County, Pennsylvania
Unincorporated communities in Pennsylvania